Jeremy "Kinetics" Dussolliet and Tim "One Love" Sommers are a hip-hop group and songwriting duo from New York City. They made their commercial debut as songwriters in 2010 by penning the chorus to B.o.B's single "Airplanes." They have collaborated with R.A. the Rugged Man and Remedy from Wu-Tang Killa Bees, Termanology and the Unknown Prophets, Neon Hitch, Melanie Martinez and Wynter Gordon.

About
Kinetics & One Love began writing music together after meeting in 2007 and forming a hip-hop group – with Kinetics as the rapper and One Love as the producer. In 2009, they released their first album Fading Back to Normal, featuring the original Kinetics & One Love version of "Airplanes," with One Love production and Kinetics rap verses. After handing out a few hundred copies of the album around New York, a copy made its way into the offices of Atlantic Records in New York City. While still college students at Cornell University, Dussolliet and Sommers were invited to the label to speak with A&Rs from Atlantic and, in early 2010, signed a publishing deal with Warner/Chappell Music, Inc. "Airplanes" was bought by Atlantic and became the second single off rapper B.o.B's debut album, The Adventures of Bobby Ray. Paramore's Hayley Williams was also featured on the track. The song climbed to the number 2 spot on the Billboard Hot 100. A second version of "Airplanes" featuring Eminem was also included on B.o.B's album and was nominated for a Grammy for Best Pop Collaboration.

After the release of "Airplanes," Kinetics & One Love moved to New York City and began writing and producing for various pop and indie artists, managed by Nullah Sarker of Hourglass Entertainment. In the summer of 2012, Kinetics released a hip-hop mixtape entitled With A Little Help From My Friends, with guest appearances by R.A. the Rugged Man, Remedy, Nitty Scott, and others. One Love produced half of the songs on the mixtape and mixed and engineered the entire project. On August 28, 2012, Kinetics & One Love released their second album You Are Not Alone, with guest appearances from Termanology, Wynter Gordon, and Nitty Scott. The album broke the top ten on the iTunes hip-hop chart and climbed to #55 on the all albums iTunes chart. It also landed at No. 57 on Billboard Magazine'''s R&B/Hip-Hop chart and No. 32 on its Heatseekers chart..

Songwriting credits

Discography
 The Kinetics EP (2008) (solo Kinetics project)
 Fading Back To Normal (2009)
 With A Little Help From My Friends (2012) (solo Kinetics project)
 You Are Not Alone (2012)

Awards
 2011 Grammy nomination for Best Pop Collaboration''
 2011 ASCAP Pop Music Award
 2011 ASCAP Rhythm & Soul Music Award

References

External links
 Official website of Kinetics & One Love

Musical groups established in 2006
Warner Music Group artists
American hip hop groups
Musical groups from New York City
American musical duos
Hip hop duos